Adsmore is a living history museum located on North Jefferson Street in Princeton, Kentucky. It is the only living home museum in Kentucky. Its name is believed to be derived from numerous additions and renovations over 150 years.

History
Adsmore was originally constructed as the Greek Revival-style residence of dry goods merchant John Higgins in 1854. James B. Hewitt owned the residence from about 1870 until 1900. At that time, it was sold to John Parker Smith, of the prominent Smith-Garrett family, who employed Brinton B. Davis to enlarge it in his noted Colonial Revival style. The house passed to Smith's daughter, Mayme (Smith) Garrett, on his death. Garrett's daughter, Katharine Garrett, inherited Adsmore and made it her home until her death in September 1984. She bequeathed the Adsmore estate to the trustees of the George Coon Public Library. Her will stipulated that all of its elaborate furnishings be restored and that the house be maintained as a public museum.  Along with the residence, her endowment for the operation of a museum is said to be over $1 million.

Museum
Adsmore was added to the National Register of Historic Places in 1973. It opened as a museum in 1986.

The grounds of Adsmore contain the house structure, the carriage house that now serves as a gift shop, and a log cabin containing Ratliff's Gun Shop, a functioning gunsmith's shop that dates to the 1840s.  The Adsmore House and Museum conducts tours each weekday and for special events such as the Black Patch Festival.  The tour's content and the furnishings and decor change for the different "seasons" depicted in the house.

Gallery

References

External links 
 
 Attractions in Western Kentucky
 Adsmore House & Museum (Archived 2009-10-24)

Greek Revival houses in Kentucky
Houses completed in 1854
Living museums in Kentucky
Museums established in 1986
Museums in Caldwell County, Kentucky
National Register of Historic Places in Caldwell County, Kentucky
Houses on the National Register of Historic Places in Kentucky
Houses in Caldwell County, Kentucky
1986 establishments in Kentucky
1854 establishments in Kentucky
Princeton, Kentucky